Masacre Musical is the debut studio album by American reggaeton performer De La Ghetto, released on October 14, 2008 by Sony Music. The album features Mavado, Randy, Guelo Star and Teddy Riley.

Track listing
 "Gangsta" (G. Arias, V. Felix, A. Ferreira, R. Castillo) — 6:45
 "Tu Te Imaginas" (A. Ferreira, J. Walker, R. Castillo) — 2:34
 "No Me Digas Que No" (G. Arias, M. DeJesus, M. Maldonado, D. Torres, R. Castillo) — 3:01
 "Momento Que Te Vi" (V. Felix,A. Ferreira, R. Castillo, M. DeJesus) — 4:21
 "Lover" (J. Reyes, J. Salinas, O. Salinas) — 3:15
 "Come out and See" (featuring Mavado) (N. Deane, T. Thompson, G. Blair, D. Brooks, R. Castillo) — 3:51
 "Se Te Nota" (G. Arias, A. Ferreira, V. Felix, R. Castillo) — 4:06
 "Shake That Thing" (A. Ferreira, J. Walker, R. Castillo) — 3:37
 "Es Difícil" (G. Arias, V. Felix, R. Castillo) — 4:40
 "Booty" (featuring Randy) (G. Arias, M. Maldonado, W. Sabat, D. Torres, R. Castillo, R. Ortiz) — 4:15
 "Así Es" (featuring Guelo Star) (V. Felix, R. Castillo, M. de Jesus) — 3:57
 "Amor en La Jipeta" (J. Mteo, R. Castillo, L. Santos) — 3:33
 "Perdición" (V. Felix, R. Castillo, M. DeJesus) — 4:39
 "Serial Lover" (featuring Teddy Riley) (R. Jackson, T. Riley) — 3:40
 "Como el Viento" (A. Ferreira, R. Castillo, M. DeJesus) — 3:21
 "Chica Mala" (J. "Nely" De La Cruz, A. Ferreira, M. Masis, R. Castillo) — 3:54
 "Solo y Vacío" (G. Arias, A. R. Crespo, A. Ferreira, V. Felix, R. Castillo) — 4:59

Chart performance

Credits
Jason Fleming - Engineering
Daniel Hastings - Graphic Design, Art Direction, Photography, Creative Director
Randy "Randy" Ortiz - Co-executive Producer
Lenny Santos - Co-executive Producer
Miguel Angel "Guelo Star"  De jesus - Co-Songwriter, Composer

References

2008 debut albums
Albums produced by Nely
Reggaeton albums
Latin trap albums